= Walter Holbem =

English footballer

Personal information
- Full name: Walter Holbem
- Date of birth: 1884
- Place of birth: Sheffield, England
- Date of death: June 18, 1930 (aged 43–44)
- Place of death: Ascot Racecourse, Berkshire, England
- Position: Full back

Senior career*
Years	Team	Apps	(Gls)
1905–1906	Staten Island Soccer club		
1906–1911	The Wednesday	86	(0)
1911–1913	Everton	18	(0)
1913–1914	St Mirren		
1914–1915	Preston North End	37	(0)
1919	Southport Central		
Total		141	(0)
- * Club domestic league appearances and goals

Walter Holbem (1884–1930) was an English footballer who played in the Football League for Everton, Preston North End and The Wednesday. He died in June 1930 after he was struck by lightning at Ascot Racecourse where he was working as a bookmaker.
